The Star Trek Role Playing Game is a role-playing game published by Last Unicorn Games in 1999.

History
Kenneth Hite and Steven S. Long joined in the developers working for Last Unicorn Games on the "Icon system" for their line of licensed Star Trek role-playing games; to get Star Trek: The Next Generation Role-playing Game ready for GenCon 31, they were flown out to Los Angeles for two weeks. After the design of Icon was done, Hite was made the line developer for the Star Trek: The Original Series role-playing game.

S. John Ross wrote Among the Clans: The Andorians and the Star Trek Narrator's Toolkit for Last Unicorn Games.

Publications
45000 - Star Trek: The Original Series Role-playing Game (hardcover)
45001 - TOS Narrator's Toolkit (book & screen)  
45101 - Among the Clans: The Andorians

Reviews
Pyramid

References

Last Unicorn Games games
Role-playing games based on Star Trek
Role-playing games introduced in 1999